The 74th Primetime Creative Arts Emmy Awards honored the best in artistic and technical achievement in American prime time television programming from June 1, 2021, until May 31, 2022, as chosen by the Academy of Television Arts & Sciences. The awards were presented on September 3 and 4, 2022, at the Microsoft Theater in Downtown Los Angeles, California. A total of 99 Creative Arts Emmys were presented across 93 categories. The ceremonies were broadcast in the United States by FXX on September 10.

Adele One Night Only, The Beatles: Get Back, Euphoria, Stranger Things, and The White Lotus each received five awards, leading all programs. Euphoria also tied with Succession for the most nominations, with each receiving 13. Overall program awards went to Adele One Night Only, Arcane, The Beatles: Get Back, Carpool Karaoke: The Series, Chip 'n Dale: Rescue Rangers, Full Frontal with Samantha Bee Presents: Once Upon a Time in Late Night, George Carlin's American Dream, Love, Death & Robots, Love on the Spectrum U.S., The Pepsi Super Bowl LVI Halftime Show, Queer Eye, Stanley Tucci: Searching for Italy, and When Claude Got Shot. HBO and HBO Max led all networks with a combined 26 wins from 93 nominations.

Winners and nominees

Winners are listed first, highlighted in boldface, and indicated with a double dagger (‡). Sections are based upon the categories listed in the 2021–2022 Emmy rules and procedures. Area awards and juried awards are denoted next to the category names as applicable. For simplicity, producers who received nominations for program awards have been omitted.

Programs

Performing

Animation

Art Direction

Casting

Choreography

Cinematography

Commercial

Costumes

Directing

Hairstyling

Lighting Design / Lighting Direction

Main Title and Motion Design

Makeup

Music

Picture Editing

Sound Editing

Sound Mixing

Special Visual Effects

Stunts

Technical Direction

Writing

Nominations and wins by program
For the purposes of the lists below, any wins in juried categories are assumed to have a prior nomination.

Nominations and wins by network

Ceremony order and presenters
The following categories were presented at each ceremony:

Ceremony information
In April 2022, the Academy of Television Arts & Sciences announced that the 74th Primetime Creative Arts Emmy Awards would be held on September 3 and 4, leading into the 74th Primetime Emmy Awards on September 12. Nominations for the awards were announced on July 12. The first night of awards focused on unscripted, variety, and animated programming, while the second night focused on scripted programs. For the first time since 2019, the ceremonies were held at the Microsoft Theater in Downtown Los Angeles; the ceremonies had been held elsewhere the previous two years due to the COVID-19 pandemic. Additionally, the ceremonies were followed by the Governors Galas for the first time since before the pandemic. The two nights were edited into a single broadcast shown on FXX on September 10 and made available later on Hulu.

The event used a mix of tables and theater seating; producer Bob Bain explained that the tables aimed to create a "nightclub environment". Additionally, satellite stages were positioned to shorten walks for some winners. To keep each ceremony around two and a half hours, the producers opted to go hostless, instead using short monologues and comedy bits from presenters. To comply with COVID-19 protocols, all production members and attendees were required to show a negative COVID-19 test before the event.

Category and rule changes
Changes for the Creative Arts categories this year included:
 Comedy and drama series designations were no longer based on runtime; instead, producers decided where to submit programs, subject to Television Academy review.
 The categories for Outstanding Interactive Program and Outstanding Innovation in Interactive Programming were eliminated. Interactive programs were eligible for submission in other categories.
 Outstanding Stunt Coordination was split back into Outstanding Stunt Coordination for a Comedy Series or Variety Program and Outstanding Stunt Coordination for a Drama Series, Limited or Anthology Series or Movie.
 Outstanding Technical Direction, Camerawork, Video Control for a Special, Outstanding Lighting Design / Lighting Direction for a Variety Series, and Outstanding Lighting Design / Lighting Direction for a Variety Special became area awards.
 The names for Outstanding Hairstyling for a Variety, Nonfiction or Reality Program and Outstanding Makeup for a Variety, Nonfiction or Reality Program were updated, and both were shifted to juried awards.
 Any films placed on the Academy of Motion Picture Arts and Sciences platform became ineligible for the Emmys (previously, this rule only applied to non-documentary films).

In addition, several categories were moved between the main and Creative Arts broadcasts. Outstanding Variety Special (Live) and Outstanding Variety Special (Pre-Recorded) were moved to the Creative Arts ceremonies, while Outstanding Writing for a Variety Special replaced Outstanding Writing for a Variety Series in the main broadcast.

Notes

References

External links
 74th Primetime Creative Arts Emmy Awards at Emmys.com
 
 Academy of Television Arts and Sciences website

074 Creative Arts
2022 in American television
2022 in Los Angeles
2022 awards in the United States
2022 television awards
September 2022 events in the United States